The Tartagine is a river in the department of Haute-Corse, Corsica, France.
It flows through the Monte Cinto massif.
It is a tributary of the Asco, which in turn is a tributary of the Golo.

Course

It crosses the communes of Canavaggia, Castifao, Mausoléo, Moltifao, Olmi-Cappella and Vallica.

The Tartagine rises to the east of the  Monte Corona in the commune of Olmi-Cappella.
It is known as the Ruisseau de Balaninu in its upper section above the Fontaine de Targtagine.
The river flows northeast through the Forêt de Tartagine-Melaja to the south of the village of Mausoléo, then east to the village of Piana north of Castifao, then southeast to its confluence with the Asco to the north of Ponte Leccia.
The Asco in turn joins the Golo soon after.

Downstream from Piana the Tartagine is followed by the D247 road and then the T30 road.

Environment

The Forêt de Tartagine (Tartagine Forest) is dominated by maritime pines (Pinus pinaster) and black pines (Pinus nigra laricio), but has varied flora and fauna including golden eagle (Aquila chrysaetos), bearded vulture (Gypaetus barbatus) and mouflon (Ovis gmelini).
In the 1990s the forest was cleaned up and the trails were marked for visitors.
Hiking trails connect the villages and the remains of old mills and Genoese bridges. 
The river is shaded by trees and fairly calm, so is a popular place for families to walk and swim.

Tributaries
The following streams (ruisseaux) are tributaries of the Tartagine:

 Forci 
 Bocigione 
 Cavoni 
 Melaja (river) 
 San Parteo 
 Grossi 
 Caselle 
 Rega 
 Buginu 
 Germanu 
 San Pietro 
 Valle di Luco 
 Vadarbico 
 Aghia Aschese 
 Conculaccio 
 Francioni 
 Avarozia 
 Pinelli 
 Pandigranaccio 
 Piane 
 Rosario 
 Atembre 
 Alzone 
 Monti Rossi 
 Lagani 
 Scalambra 
 Cattarello 
 Conconi 
 Arena 
 Aulina 
 Frescolina 
 la Calanca Mozza 
 Petra Inone 
 Pino 
 Muraccie 
 Muraticalvi 
 Forcine 
 Forci 
 Purgatorio 
 Line e d'Alzo 
 Piovanaccio 
 Paratella 
 Vitalba 
 Palmente 
 Migiatto 
 Quercitello 
 Castiglione 
 Casiccia 
 Corona 
 Calanello 
 Marcognaninco 
 Saltellole 
 Cutticcio 
 Sugitte 
 Pratella

Notes

Sources

Rivers of Haute-Corse
Rivers of France